Salvia dolomitica (South African sage) is a perennial shrub native to the northeast province of Transvaal in South Africa, typically growing at 900–1500 m elevation. Profusely covered with grey leaves, it grows to 2 m in height and width in the wild, with pale lilac flowers.

Notes

dolomitica
Flora of the Northern Provinces
Plants described in 1957